The women's 5000 metres walk event at the 1985 Summer Universiade was held at the Kobe Universiade Memorial Stadium in Kobe on 30 August. It was the first time that any racewalking event was contested by women at the Universiade.

Results

References

Athletics at the 1985 Summer Universiade
1985